Voltz may refer to:

Voltz (surname)
Toyota Voltz, Toyota automobile

See also
Voltz Lake, Wisconsin, unincorporated community in the United States